Mitromorpha benthicola is a species of sea snail, a marine gastropod mollusk in the family Mitromorphidae.

Description
The length of the shell attains , its diameter .

Distribution
This marine species occurs off the Ninety Mile Beach, North Island, New Zealand

References

 Spencer, H.G., Marshall, B.A. & Willan, R.C. (2009). Checklist of New Zealand living Mollusca. pp 196–219. in: Gordon, D.P. (ed.) New Zealand inventory of biodiversity. Volume one. Kingdom Animalia: Radiata, Lophotrochozoa, Deuterostomia. Canterbury University Press, Christchurch

External links
 Spencer H.G., Willan R.C., Marshall B.A. & Murray T.J. (2011). Checklist of the Recent Mollusca Recorded from the New Zealand Exclusive Economic Zone
 
 Museum of New Zealand : Mitromorpha benthicola

benthicola
Gastropods described in 1962
Gastropods of New Zealand